Vojvodina is an autonomous region within Serbia located in the Pannonian plain, a region of central Europe. It shares borders with Romania in the east, Hungary in the north, Croatia in the west, and Bosnia and Herzegovina in the southwest. The southern border is administrative line to Šumadija and Western Serbia, Belgrade, and Southern and Eastern Serbia.

Geographical regions of Vojvodina
Bačka
Šajkaška
Telečka
Gornji Breg
Paorija
Banat
Veliki Rit
Gornje Livade
Dištrikt
Gornjani
Poljadija
Krašovani
Ere
Srem
Podlužje
Fruška Gora
Mačva
Podunavlje
Posavina
Potisje
Pomorišje

Mountains and hills

Fruška Gora
Titelski Breg
Vršački Breg
Zagajička Brda

Sands

Deliblatska Peščara
Subotičko-Horgoška Peščara

Rivers
Danube
Tisa
Sava
Begej
Tamiš
Karaš
Zlatica
Nera
Bosut
Krivaja
Čik
Mostonga
Plazović

Canals
Canal Danube-Tisa-Danube, and some larger canals part of DTD system:
Begej canal
Jegrička canal
Jarčina canal

Lakes and bogs
Palićko lake
Ludoško lake
Ledinačko lake
Rusanda lake
Obedska bog

Gallery

External links
Atlas of Vojvodina (Wikimedia Commons)